Vladimir Lapitsky (born 18 February 1959) is a Soviet fencer. He won a silver medal in the team foil event at the 1980 Summer Olympics.

References

1959 births
Living people
Belarusian male foil fencers
Soviet male foil fencers
Olympic fencers of the Soviet Union
Fencers at the 1980 Summer Olympics
Olympic silver medalists for the Soviet Union
Olympic medalists in fencing
Sportspeople from Grodno
Medalists at the 1980 Summer Olympics